Alkmaar Zaanstreek, better known as AZ Alkmaar or simply AZ, is a Dutch professional football club from Alkmaar and the Zaan district. The club plays in the Eredivisie, the highest professional football league in the Netherlands, and hosts home matches at the AFAS Stadion.

AZ has won the Eredivisie twice, in 1980–81 and 2008–09. In the same season as their first league title, they also reached the UEFA Cup Final, which they lost to Ipswich Town. In addition, the team has won the KNVB Cup on four occasions and one Johan Cruyff Shield.

History

1910–1972: Foundation and first years
AZ was founded on 10 May 1967 as AZ '67, the result of a merger of Alkmaar '54 and FC Zaanstreek. Alkmaar '54 was founded as a professional team in April 1954 to play in the 10-team NBVB league, created because the Royal Dutch Football Association (KNVB) refused to organize a professional league (the KNVB took over in 1955). Alkmaar '54, and by extension AZ, played the very first professional match in the Netherlands: on 14 August 1954, they won 3–0 at home against Venlo '54, with Klaas Smit scoring the first (and third) goal.

FC Zaanstreek had been playing since 1910 as the Kooger Football Club (KFC). KFC had nearly become national champion in 1934 through a narrow loss to Ajax in the finals. The team became professional in 1955. In 1964 the professional part of KFC was renamed FC Zaanstreek, while the amateurs played on as KFC.

Also in 1964, the brothers Cees and Klaas Molenaar, former players and trainers for KFC and owners of a growing appliance store chain, sought to create a powerful football team in Zaanstreek by merging the two local professional teams: KFC and Zaanlandsche Football Club. After the ZFC leadership thwarted this attempt, the Molenaars successfully merged FC Zaanstreek with Alkmaar '54 in 1967. FC Zaanstreek had finished 7th and Alkmaar '54 12th in 1966–67 Eerste Divisie. The team would be based in Alkmaar, though the second team originally trained and played in Koog aan de Zaan.

1972–1985: The Molenaar years
Partially through the hiring of expensive foreign players, the new club soon acquired large debts. In 1972, the Molenaar brothers bailed it out and invested heavily in the club, to the point that AZ '67 were successful in the late 1970s and early '80s, regularly playing European football from 1977 to 1982 while also winning three KNVB Cups over that period.

After four close league campaigns, AZ finally became Dutch champions in 1981, becoming the only team other than the "big three" of Ajax,  and PSV to do so in a 44-year period spanning from 1965 to 2009 (when AZ once again won the league title). They won the title with overwhelming power, winning 27 of 34 matches and only losing once, while scoring a club record 101 goals and conceding just 30. That same season, AZ reached the final of the UEFA Cup, losing 5–4 on aggregate to Ipswich Town. The next year, in the European Cup, they lost in the second round 3–2 on aggregate to Liverpool.

Georg Keßler was AZ's manager over most of these years (1978–82), while star players included: Kees Kist, the club's highest ever goalscorer with 212 goals and the first ever Dutchman to win the European Golden Boot in 1979 when he scored 34 goals in a season; Jan Peters, who played 120 matches for AZ during this period scoring 30 goals from midfield; and Hugo Hovenkamp, who played 239 matches in defence for AZ from 1975 to 1983, as well as receiving 31 caps for the Netherlands national team from 1977 to 1983 and playing each match in UEFA Euro 1980 while an AZ player. Additional stars included John Metgod, who spent six years at AZ playing 195 matches as a defender, scoring 26 goals including a goal against Ipswich Town in the final of the UEFA Cup. Like Hovenkamp, Metgod was also included in the Dutch squad for Euro 1980. Meanwhile, Danish forward Kristen Nygaard spent ten years at AZ, scoring 104 goals in 363 matches between 1972 and 1982.

1985–1993: The interim years

Co-owner Cees Molenaar died in 1979. AZ's fortunes deteriorated after his brother, Klaas Molenaar, left the club in 1985. After several mid-table finishes in previous seasons, AZ was relegated in 1988 from the Eredivisie, ending the season on 28 points from 34 matches and falling to the  due to the superior goal difference of Roda JC. This relegation was significant since it occurred just seven years after the club's historic domestic double and marked the end of AZ's first period of success in Dutch football. Following this, AZ spent much of the next decade in the second tier, struggling to find a return to the top flight.

1993–2009: The Scheringa years
The involvement of businessman Dirk Scheringa in the mid-1990s marked the revival of the club as AZ returned to the Eredivisie, winning the 1997-98 Eerste Divisie title. The club achieved consecutive finishes around the middle positions in the league until ending up in third place in the 2004-05 Eredivisie season, AZ's highest position for 23 years. In the summer of 2006, the club moved to a new 17,000 capacity stadium, AZ Stadion.

Despite playing strongly for the majority of the 2006–07 season, AZ's season ended in disappointment. First, entering the last matchday of the 2006–07 Eredivisie season, AZ led PSV and Ajax on goal difference at the top of the league table, but ended up third after losing their last match against 16th placed team Excelsior, AZ played with ten men for 80 minutes. Additionally, AZ then lost the KNVB Cup final to Ajax 8–7 after a penalty shoot-out, while also falling to Ajax over two play-off matches for participation in the Champions League. After the season, key players like Tim de Cler, Danny Koevermans and Shota Arveladze left the team.

A remarkable run ended in the 2007–08 season: after AZ lost a group stage match against Everton (3–2) in the UEFA Cup, the club's unbeaten run of 32 home matches in European competitions – lasting from 1977 to 2007 – ended. AZ had a poor season, suffering elimination in the first round of the KNVB Cup and the group stage of the UEFA Cup, as well as finishing the 2007–08 Eredivisie in a disappointing 11th place. Towards the latter stages of the season, in March 2008, AZ manager Louis van Gaal had initially tendered his resignation, but after protests the players and directors, he rescinded his resignation.

The 2008–09 season had an unpromising start after two opening defeats against NAC Breda and ADO Den Haag. However, starting with a 1–0 victory over defending league champions PSV, AZ did not lose a match in its next 28 matches, including a run of 11-straight matches where AZ did not concede an opposition goal. Three weeks before the end of the season, AZ became Eredivisie champions, edging nearest title rivals Twente and Ajax comfortably. This was a historic achievement for the club as this was the first title-winning season for 28 years, and it also meant a return to the UEFA Champions League.

Being league champions, AZ qualified for the Champions League for only the second time. It was drawn into a group alongside Arsenal FC, Standard Liège and Olympiacos but only took four points from six matches and finished bottom of their group.

2009–2014: Advocaat–Verbeek years 
For the 2009–10 season, Ronald Koeman succeeded Louis van Gaal, who had departed to manage Bayern Munich after leading AZ to the championship. Koeman was officially hired on 17 May 2009, but on 5 December, AZ announced he was no longer in charge of the club after losing 7 of his first 16 matches. Former Rangers and Zenit Saint Petersburg manager Dick Advocaat took over for the remainder of the season. Under Advocaat, AZ achieved solid results and secured European football for the next season.

For the 2010–11 season, AZ appointed Gertjan Verbeek as its new manager. They finished the 2010–11 Eredivisie in fourth place, thus securing Europa League football for the next season, while in the KNVB Cup, AZ reached the last eight, where they were beaten by rivals Ajax by a 1–0 scoreline. AZ also finished third in their Europa League group, thus failing to qualifying for the competition's knockout round.

In the 2011–12 season, AZ finished fourth in the Eredivisie, though performed significantly better in cup competitions, reaching the semi-finals in the KNVB Cup (losing to Heracles after extra time) and the quarter-finals in the Europa League. In the latter, the club ultimately lost to Valencia after having defeated Udinese, Anderlecht, Malmö FF, Austria Wien, Metalist Kharkiv, Aalesund and Baumit Jablonec to reach that stage.

On 21 December 2011, during the quarter-finals of the 2011–12 KNVB Cup, a 19-year-old Ajax fan invaded the Amsterdam Arena pitch in the 36th minute with Ajax winning 1–0, attacking AZ goalkeeper Esteban Alvarado. The fan slipped and Alvarado kicked the fan twice, prompting the referee to issue the goalkeeper a red card. Following this, AZ manager Gertjan Verbeek ordered his players to leave the pitch for the dressing room in protest. The match was later played on 19 January 2012, with Alvarado's red card rescinded; AZ won 3–2.

The 2012–13 season started in the Europa League with a qualifying play-off round against Guus Hiddink's Anzhi Makhachkala. AZ was hammered 6–0 on aggregate. Disappointingly, AZ finished tenth in the 2012–13 Eredivisie, although the club won the 2012–13 KNVB Cup after defeating PSV 2–1 in the final. As cup winners, AZ automatically qualified for the 2013–14 Europa League.

In September 2013, just one day after emphatically beating PSV, at the time the league leaders, Verbeek was dismissed as first team manager by the club due to "a lack of chemistry" between management and players. He was replaced by Dick Advocaat for the remainder of the season until a permanent replacement could be found. Advocaat took AZ to the semi-finals of the KNVB Cup, the quarter-finals of the Europa League and eighth in the league, ultimately losing to Groningen in the Europa League play-off final round (their 58th match of the season, a club record).

2014–2019: Van den Brom years 
The 2014–15 season began with a new manager, former Heerenveen manager and Ajax great Marco van Basten. However, after just three matches into the season, Van Basten resigned as manager to become assistant manager under Alex Pastoor, citing heavy stress as the main reason. Pastoor was the interim manager during two matches under Van Basten's absence and received the official title on 16 September, but contract negotiations failed and he left the club just two days later. A week later, John van den Brom was appointed manager. Under Van den Brom, AZ quickly rose up to the sub-top, eventually finished the season in third place, surpassing Feyenoord on the final season's matchday and qualifying for the 2015–16 Europa League.

The 2015–16 Eredivisie started with AZ selling most of its first-team players from the previous season during the summer transfer period. As a response, AZ bought players from other Dutch clubs, notably Vincent Janssen from Almere City, Alireza Jahanbakhsh from NEC and Ben Rienstra from PEC Zwolle. In December, it was announced free agent Ron Vlaar signed a contract until the end of the season after training with the club for a few weeks prior. Vlaar quickly became team captain and helped lift AZ from tenth place to a fourth-place finish in the league. Along this rise, new signing Vincent Janssen scored 27 goals for the club, earning him the Eredivisie top goalscorer title. In the 2015–16 KNVB Cup, AZ made it to the semi-finals, losing 3–1 to Feyenoord. AZ won the first two qualification rounds to qualify for the 2015–16 Europa League group stage, but finished last in their group.

At the start of the 2016–17 Eredivisie, AZ sold last season's performer Vincent Janssen to Tottenham Hotspur and long-time midfielder Markus Henriksen to Hull City. In the 2016–17 Europa League, AZ finished second in Group D, surviving the group stage for the third time in five seasons.

Since 2019: Slot–Jansen years 
After an excellent 2019/20 season in which AZ beat league leaders Ajax home and away, aided by consistent performances from youth academy talents such as Teun Koopmeiners, Myron Boadu, Calvin Stengs and Owen Wijndal, the season was forced to end early due to the effects of the COVID-19 pandemic. Joint on points with Ajax at the top of the table, AZ were given second place on goal difference, and subsequently earned Qualification to the Champions League second qualifying round.

A poor start to their 2020/21 Eredivisie campaign saw AZ draw five games in a row, before eventually picking up a victory against RKC Waalwijk on the 1st of November 2020.

AZ also struggled in European competitions this season. Despite a strong start, with a 3–1 extra time come back against Viktoria Plzen in the Champions League qualifiers, the club lost 2–0 to Dynamo Kiev several weeks later, seeing them fall back into the Europa League. After victory against Napoli and Rijeka early in the pool stages, AZ was on track to advance, though lost to Real Sociedad away, obtained a 0–0 draw in the reverse fixture, and also drew 1–1 with Napoli. Following these results, AZ needed to defeat Rijeka away to advance. However, the departure the week before the game of manager Arne Slot saw an unorganised team lose 2–1 to Rijeka, ending their European dream.

Coaching staff

Current squad

Out on loan

Jong AZ

Participating in the Eerste Divisie, the reserve squad of AZ trains and plays their home games in Zaanstad.

Stadium and sponsor

Stadium

AZ play its home matches at the AFAS Stadion, located in the southern part of the city of Alkmaar. The stadium, which is directly owned by the club, was opened in 2006 and replaced the old Alkmaarderhout venue as the DSB Stadion. The stadium currently has a capacity of 17,023. During its design stages, the name Victorie Stadion was frequently used, referring to the Dutch War of Independence, the phrase "In Alkmaar begint de victorie" (Victory begins in Alkmaar) in particular. Until now, this name has not been officially in use, the board instead opting for sponsorship deals because of financial motives. However, to this day, the name maintains a good share of support among the fans.

To further increase revenue, AZ's board of directors decided to expand the capacity of the new stadium to at least 30,000 somewhere in the future. The extension will be realised by constructing a second tier to three of the four stands. The main stand with all technical areas, VIP and sponsor and media facilities will remain in place. These plans, however, were put on hold after the DSB bankruptcy and there are no current plans to increase the capacity.

In October 2009, sponsor DSB Bank was declared bankrupt. The stadium name temporarily changed from DSB Stadion to AZ Stadion, as it was considered undesirable that the stadium was linked with a non-existent bank. In February 2010, a new main sponsor was found in construction works service provider BUKO, based in Beverwijk.

A year later, in the 2010–11 season,  took over as official stadium sponsor. The current external name of the ground is the AFAS Stadion.

On 10 August 2019, the roof of the stadium partially collapsed. No people were injured during the incident. As the result AZ spent the rest of the year playing home matches at the Cars Jeans Stadion in The Hague whilst the damaged roof was being removed, before returning to the stadium on 15 December 2019, beating Ajax 1–0 in their first match back. AZ played the rest of the 2019/20 season, until the COVID-19 pandemic cut it short, without a roof. During the 2020/21 season, a new roof was installed, held up by 20 crane-like arms on three sides and a so-called mega truss on the main stand. The renewed stadium, which also included a capacity upgrade of nearly 2,500 seats for a new total capacity of 19,500, was officially opened on September 11th, 2021, before the home game against PSV.

Kit suppliers and shirt sponsors

Honours

Domestic

 Eredivisie
Winners (2):  1980–81, 2008–09
Runners-up (3):  1979–80, 2005–06, 2019–20
 Eerste Divisie
Winners (3):  1959–601, 1995–96, 1997–98
Runners-up (3):  1956–571, 1967–68, 1971–72
 Tweede Divisie
Winners (1): 1955–562
Runners-up (1):  1963–641
 KNVB Cup
Winners (4):  1977–78, 1980–81, 1981–82, 2012–13
Runners-up (3):  2006–07, 2016–17, 2017–18
 Johan Cruyff Shield
Winners (1): 2009
Runners-up (1):  2013

International
 UEFA Cup/UEFA Europa League
Runners-up (1):  1980–81
Semi-finalists (1):  2004–05
Quarter-finalists (3):  2006–07, 2011–12, 2013–14
1 As Alkmaar '542 As KFC in the Eerste Klasse C, precursor of the Tweede Klasse in the first year of professional football in the Netherlands.

AZ in Europe
Below is a table with AZ's international results in the past seasons.

UEFA current ranking

Domestic results
Below is a table with AZ's domestic results since the introduction of professional football in 1956.

Notable (former) players
 For a list of former AZ players with a Wikipedia article, see .

The players below had senior international cap(s) for their respective countries. Players whose name is listed represented their countries while playing for AZ and its predecessor AZ'67.

Coaches

Alkmaar '54
  (1954–1956)
 Kick Smit (1956–1958)
  (1 July 1958 – 30 June 1960)
 Piet de Wolf (1960–1961)
  (1961–1962)
  (1962–1963)
  (1 July 1963 – 30 June 1965)
 Barry Hughes (1 July 1965 – 30 June 1967)

KFC / FC Zaanstreek
 Bob Kelly (1955–1956)
  (1956–1958)
  (1958–1960)
  (1960–1963)
  (1963–1964)
 Piet de Wolf (1964–1965)
  (1965–1966)

AZ '67
 Lesley Talbot (1 July 1967 – 30 June 1968)
  (1968–1969)
 Robert Heinz (1969–1971)
 Cor van der Hart (1 July 1971 – 30 June 1973)
 Joop Brand (1 July 1973 – 30 June 1976)
 Hans Kraay Sr. (1 July 1976 – 30 June 1977)
 Jan Notermans (1977)
 Cor van der Hart (1 July 1977 – 30 June 1978)
 Georg Keßler (1 July 1978 – 30 June 1982)
 Hans Eijkenbroek (1 July 1982 – 30 June 1983)
 Piet de Visser (1 July 1983 – 30 June 1985)
 Joop Brand (1 July 1985 – 30 June 1986)
 Han Berger (1 July 1986 – 31 December 1986)

AZ
 Hans Eijkenbroek (1987 – 30 June 1989)
 Hans van Doorneveld (1 July 1989 – 30 June 1990)
 Henk Wullems (1 July 1990 – 30 June 1993)
 Piet Schrijvers (1 July 1993 – 30 June 1994)
 Theo Vonk (1 July 1994 – 28 February 1997)
 Hans de Koning (interim) (28 February 1997 – 30 June 1997)
 Willem van Hanegem (1 July 1997 – 30 June 1999)
 Gerard van der Lem (1 July 1999 – 30 March 2000)
 Henk van Stee (31 March 2000 – 30 October 2002)
 Co Adriaanse (30 October 2002 – 30 June 2005)
 Louis van Gaal (1 July 2005 – 30 June 2009)
 Ronald Koeman (1 July 2009 – 5 December 2009)
 Martin Haar (interim) (5 December 2009 – 10 December 2009)
 Dick Advocaat (10 December 2009 – 30 June 2010)
 Gertjan Verbeek (1 July 2010 – 29 September 2013)
 Martin Haar (interim) (29 September 2013 – 15 October 2013)
 Dick Advocaat (15 October 2013 – 30 June 2014)
 Marco van Basten (30 June 2014 – 16 September 2014)
 John van den Brom (29 September 2014 – 30 June 2019)
 Arne Slot (1 July 2019  – 5 December 2020)
 Pascal Jansen (5 December 2020 – present )

Notes

References

 
1967 establishments in the Netherlands
Association football clubs established in 1967
Football clubs in the Netherlands
Football clubs in Alkmaar